The consensus 1961 College Basketball All-American team, as determined by aggregating the results of seven major All-American teams.  To earn "consensus" status, a player must win honors from a majority of the following teams: the Associated Press, the USBWA, The United Press International, the National Association of Basketball Coaches, the Newspaper Enterprise Association (NEA), The Sporting News, and the National Collegiate Association Bureau (NCAB).  1961 was the only year where the National Collegiate Association Bureau teams were used in determining consensus teams.

1961 Consensus All-America team

Individual All-America teams

AP Honorable Mention:

 Bill Bridges, Kansas
 Carroll Broussard, Texas A&M
 Al Butler, Niagara
 Howie Carl, DePaul
 Len Chappell, Wake Forest
 Tom Chilton, East Tennessee St.
 Jeff Cohen, William & Mary
 Larry Comley, Kansas State
 Freddie Crawford, St. Bonaventure
 Dave DeBusschere, Detroit
 Bill Depp, Vanderbilt
 Bruce Drysdale, Temple
 Jack Egan, Saint Joseph's
 Johnny Egan, Providence
 Dave Fedor, Florida State
 Jack Foley, Holy Cross
 Jerry Graves, Mississippi State
 Bill Green, Colorado State
 Gus Guydon, Drake
 Jim Hadnot, Providence
 Ron Heller, Wichita State
 Charles Henke, Missouri
 Dick Hickox, Miami (FL)
 Wayne Hightower, Kansas
 Paul Hogue, Cincinnati
 Harold Hudgens, Texas Tech
 Don Kojis, Marquette
 Billy Ray Lickert, Kentucky
 Whitey Martin, St. Bonaventure
 Bill McClintock, California
 Lou Merchant, Florida
 Tom Meschery, Saint Mary's
 Del Ray Mounts, Texas Tech
 George Nattin, LSU
 Don Nelson, Iowa
 Mel Nowell, Ohio State
 Gary Phillips, Houston
 Cedric Price, Kansas State
 Chris Smith, Virginia Tech
 Rod Thorn, West Virginia
 John Tidwell, Michigan
 Jack Turner, Louisville
 Charlie Warren, Oregon
 Hank Whitney, Iowa State
 Bob Wiesenhahn, Cincinnati

See also
 1960–61 NCAA University Division men's basketball season

References

NCAA Men's Basketball All-Americans
All-Americans